Fred Parks may refer to:

Fred W. Parks (1871–1941), Lieutenant Governor of Colorado, 1905–1907
Frederick Parks (1885–1945), heavyweight boxing champion

See also
Fred Taylor Park, home stadium to Waitakere United